Jeff or Jeffrey Cohen may refer to:

Jeff Cohen (basketball) (1939–1978), American professional basketball player
Jeff Cohen (actor) (born 1974), American attorney and former child actor (The Goonies)
Jeff Cohen (media critic), founder of Fairness & Accuracy in Reporting, a media watchdog group in the United States
Jeff Cohen (playwright and theater director), American theater director, playwright and producer
Jeff Cohen (songwriter) (born 1966), American songwriter, producer and publisher
Jeff Cohen (pianist), American pianist, accompanist of baritone Tassis Christoyannis
Geoffrey Cohen, a pseudonym used by representatives of the activist group Jewdas
Jeffrey A. Cohen (born 1954), American neurologist
Jeffrey E. Cohen (active from 1971), American R&B, soul and funk songwriter and record producer
Jeffrey H. Cohen (born 1962), American anthropologist
J. J. Cohen (born 1965), American actor